Cytherideis is an extinct genus of ostracods in the family Cytheridae. The genus was erected by Thomas Rupert Jones in 1856.Species are known from the Miocene of Venezuela and the Eocene of United States (Alabama).

References

External links 

 
 Cytherideis at fossilworks
 Cytherideis at WoRMS
 Cytherideis elegans at WoRMS

Podocopida genera
Prehistoric ostracod genera